Rogozhin is a Russian male surname, its feminine counterpart is Rogozhina. It may refer to

Anatoly Rogozhin, Russian officer who was the last commander of the Russian Corps in Serbia during World War II
Sergey Rogozhin (1956–1983), Russian Olympic equestrian
Lyudmila Rogozhina (born 1959), Ukrainian basketball player

See also
Rogozin
Ragozin

Russian-language surnames